The 2012–13 UEFA Women's Champions League was the 12th edition of the European women's championship for football clubs. The final was held at Stamford Bridge, London, England on 23 May 2013.

Team allocation and distribution
The national champions and runners-up, where known, in nations that have participated in the past five years are listed as expected to compete. Some of these teams may choose not to participate. Norway has overtaken Iceland in the UEFA coefficients and thus assured themselves a second entry.

Countries are allocated places according to their UEFA league coefficient for women. A first entry list was posted on 14 June 2012 by the Belgian representative. Not returning since last year is the champion of Luxembourg, for the first time Montenegro sends its champion. Here CH denotes the national champion, RU the national runner-up.

1. On 6 December 2011 it was announced that the 2011 FA WSL Runners-up were given the spot, and not as initially planned the 2011–12 FA Women's Cup winner.

Round and draw dates
UEFA has scheduled the competition as follows.

Qualifying round
32 teams enter in the qualifying round, and were divided into eight groups of four teams, with one team from each seeding pot. The group-winners and best two runners-up qualify for the round of 32.

Seeding and draw

32 teams entered in the qualifying round, and were divided into eight groups of four teams, with one team from each seeding pot:

Pot 1
  Glasgow City
  Unia Racibórz
  PAOK
  Zürich
  Apollon Limassol (host)
  1° Dezembro
  SFK 2000 (host)
  NSA Sofia

Pot 2
  MTK
  Zhytlobud-1 Kharkiv
  Bobruichanka
  Gintra Universitetas
  PK-35 Vantaa (host)
  ASA Tel Aviv University
  Olimpia Cluj
  BIIK Kazygurt

Pot 3
  Osijek
  KÍ Klaksvík
  Spartak Subotica (host)
  Peamount United
  Slovan Bratislava (host)
  Naše Taksi (host)
  Glentoran Belfast United
  Pomurje (host)

Pot 4
  Pärnu JK
  Ataşehir Belediyesi
  Cardiff Met. Ladies
  FC Noroc
  Ada
  Birkirkara (host)
  Skonto/Ceriba
  Ekonomist

The eight hosts were confirmed by UEFA before the draw, and two hosts could not be placed in the same group. Each team played the other teams in the group once. The matches were played between 11 and 16 August 2012. The draw was held on 28 June 2012.

Tie-breaker criteria
As usual in UEFA competitions, three points are awarded for a win, and one point for a draw. If teams are equal on points after all matches have been played, the following criteria applies:

 Higher number of points obtained in the matches among the teams in question.
 Superior goal difference resulting from the matches among the teams in question.
 Higher number of goals scored in the matches among the teams in question.
 Superior goal difference in all group matches
 Higher number of goals scored in all group matches
 Higher number of club coefficient points
 Drawing of lots

Criteria 1–3 are reapplied until the tie cannot be resolved; only then is criteria 4 used.

Group 1

Group 2

Group 3

Group 4

Group 5

Group 6
Apollon's 21–0 victory over Ada set a new competition record.

Group 7

Group 8

Ranking of group runners-up
The two best runners-up also qualify for the round of 32. The match against the fourth-placed team in the group does not count for the purposes of the runners-up table. The tie-breakers in this ranking are:

 Higher number of points obtained
 Superior goal difference
 Higher number of goals scored
 Higher number of club coefficient points
 Fair play conduct in all group matches

Knockout stage
The top 16 ranked teams are seeded for the round of 32. Team that qualified through the qualifying round are marked with (Q).

Seeded:
  Lyon
  Turbine Potsdam
  Arsenal
  Rossiyanka
  Brøndby
  Torres
  Juvisy
  Bardolino Verona
  Neulengbach
  Göteborg
  Sparta Praha
  Fortuna Hjørring
  LdB Malmö
  Røa
  Wolfsburg
  Zorky Krasnogorsk

Unseeded:
  Glasgow City (Q)
  Unia Racibórz (Q)
  Standard Liège
  Birmingham City
  Stabæk
  Zürich (Q)
  Apollon Limassol (Q)
  SFK 2000 (Q)
  MTK (Q)
  Barcelona
  PK-35 Vantaa (Q)
  Stjarnan
  Olimpia Cluj (Q)
  BIIK Kazygurt (Q)
  Spartak Subotica (Q)
  ADO Den Haag

Bracket

Round of 32

First leg

Second leg

Turbine Potsdam won 8–1 on aggregate.

Stabæk won 5–3 on aggregate.

Lyon won 12–0 on aggregate.

LdB Malmö won 10–1 on aggregate.

Göteborg won 4–0 on aggregate.

3–3 on aggregate. Olimpia Cluj won on away goals.

Torres won 6–3 on aggregate.

Fortuna Hjørring won 2–1 on aggregate.

Bardolino Verona won 3–2 on aggregate.

Zorky Krasnogorsk won 3–1 on aggregate.

Rossiyanka won 5–3 on aggregate.

Arsenal won 7–0 on aggregate.

Røa won 8–0 on aggregate.

Wolfsburg won 11–2 on aggregate.

Juvisy won 2–1 on aggregate.

Sparta Praha won 6–0 on aggregate.

Round of 16

First leg

Second leg

Wolfsburg won 5–2 on aggregate.

Lyon won 11–0 on aggregate.

Arsenal won 6–4 on aggregate.

Göteborg won 4–3 on aggregate.

LdB Malmö won 3–0 on aggregate.

Rossiyanka won 3–2 on aggregate.

Torres won 7–1 on aggregate.

Juvisy won 2–1 on aggregate.

Quarter-finals
There was an open draw held for the quarterfinals and the following rounds on 27 November 2012.

First leg

Second leg

Arsenal won 4–1 on aggregate.

Juvisy won 4–1 on aggregate.

Wolfsburg won 4–1 on aggregate.

Lyon won 8–0 on aggregate.

Semi-finals

First leg

Second leg

Wolfsburg won 4–1 on aggregate.

Lyon won 9–1 on aggregate.

Final

Statistics
Top scorers and assists (excluding qualifying rounds and play-off round):

Top goalscorers
The top-scorer award is given to the player scoring the most goals including the qualifying rounds, thus Romanian player Laura Rus from Apollon Limassol won the award by scoring 11 goals up to the round of 32.  Conny Pohlers scored her 42nd goal in the competition history, to become the sole all-time topscorer.

The following are the top scorers excluding the qualifying round.

Source:

Top assists

Source:

References

External links
Official website
European league standings

 
Women's
UEFA Women's Champions League seasons
UEFA
UEFA